The Palau Red Cross Society was founded in 1977. It has its headquarters in Koror.

External links
Official website

Red Cross and Red Crescent national societies
Organizations established in 1977
Medical and health organizations based in Palau